The 2005 Deutsche Tourenwagen Masters was the nineteenth season of premier German touring car championship and also sixth season under the moniker of Deutsche Tourenwagen Masters since the series' resumption in 2000. The number of race weekends were increased from 10 events in 2004 to eleven in 2005 (although 2004 had eleven events including the non-championship race at Shanghai). Originally each track hosted one race each with the exception of Hockenheimring (two races, premier and finale), but when Avignon lost their race, EuroSpeedway also hosted two events.

Changes for 2005
 The cars built to 00-03 specs were banned from competition. Instead the whole field would be made up of cars built to the new 04 specs.
 Italy and Portugal lost their respective events. They were replaced by Belgium (Spa-Francorchamps) and Turkey (Istanbul Park).
 Opel scaled down from six to four cars, while Audi and Mercedes fielded eight each instead of the six they had run in 2004.
 Opel announced that they would leave the series shortly after the 2005 season ended.
BP's German brand Aral AG would become the official fuel retailer and convenience store partner of the series starting from round 7 at Nürburgring in mid-2005, taking over Shell's fuel partner contract. The Aral Ultimate brand would provide 100 RON unleaded gasolines and displayed in the pit gantries, trackside sponsorships and all driver's race overalls on the sleeves.

Teams and drivers
The following manufacturers, teams and drivers competed in the 2005 Deutsche Tourenwagen Masters. All teams competed with tyres supplied by Dunlop.

Race calendar and winners

Championship standings

Scoring system
Points are awarded to the top 8 classified finishers.

Drivers' championship

† — Driver retired, but was classified as they completed 90% of the winner's race distance.

Teams' championship

Manufacturers' championship

External links

 Official DTM website

Deutsche Tourenwagen Masters seasons
Deutsche Tourenwagen Masters